Mordecai Menahem Kaplan (June 11, 1881 – November 8, 1983), was a Lithuanian-born American rabbi, writer, Jewish educator, professor, theologian, philosopher, activist, and religious leader who founded the Reconstructionist branch of Judaism along with his son-in-law Ira Eisenstein. He has been described as a "towering figure" in the recent history of Judaism for his influential work in adapting it to modern society, contending that Judaism should be a unifying and creative force by stressing the cultural and historical character of the religion as well as theological doctrine.

Life and work
Mordecai Menahem Kaplan was born Mottel Kaplan in Sventiany in the Russian Empire (present-day Švenčionys in Lithuania) on June 11, 1881, the son of Haya (née Anna) and Rabbi Israel Kaplan. His father, ordained by the leading Lithuanian Jewish luminaries, went to serve as a dayan in the court of Chief Rabbi Jacob Joseph in New York City in 1888. Mordecai was brought over to New York in 1889, at the age of nine.

Although affiliated with the most traditional Orthodox institutions and personalities in the Lower East Side, his father persisted in non-conformist openness to trends he had already exhibited in Russia: he hosted discussions in his home with maverick bible critic, Arnold Ehrlich, withdrew his son from the Etz Chaim yeshiva, enrolled him in public school, and later sent him to JTS to pursue studies to become a modern Orthodox rabbi. Although not the norm amongst first generation immigrants, who tended to be very conservative and traditional, his father was not alone in this kind of religious broad-mindedness. Kaplan's early education was strictly Orthodox, but by the time he reached secondary school, he had been attracted to heterodox opinions, particularly regarding the critical approach to the Bible. To counter this, his father hired a tutor to study Maimonides's Guide for the Perplexed with Mordecai.

In 1893, Kaplan began studying for ordination at the Jewish Theological Seminary (JTS), which at that time was Modern Orthodox institution founded to strengthen Orthodoxy and combat the hegemony of the Reform movement. In 1895 he also began studies at the City College of New York, which he attended in the mornings, while going to the Seminaries in the evening. After graduating from CCNY in 1900 he went to Columbia University, studying philosophy, sociology (and education) and receiving a master's degree (and a doctorate). Majoring in philosophy, he wrote his master's thesis on the ethical philosophy of Henry Sidgwick. His lecturers included the philosopher of ethical culture Felix Adler and the sociologist Franklin Giddings.

In 1902, he was ordained at the JTS. Although Kaplan's conception of the nature of Judaism diverged from that of the seminary, he maintained a long association with the institution, teaching there for (over) 50 years; including becoming principal of its teachers’ institute in 1909, dean in 1931, and retiring in 1963. In 1903 he was appointed as administrator of the religious school at Congregation Kehilath Jeshurun (KJ), a gradually modernizing Orthodox synagogue in New York's Yorkville district, consisting of newly affluent and acculturating East European Jews who had migrated north from the Lower East Side; and by April 1904 he was appointed as rabbi of the congregation.

Based on his diary, by around this time (1904, age 23), Kaplan already had serious misgivings about Orthodoxy's ability to satisfy his spiritual needs and its unwillingness to modernize. By 1905 he notes doubting in the divine origin of the Bible and its laws, as well as the efficacy of prayers and rituals, and by 1907 he had informed his parents of these feelings. Being that he was already serving as a Rabbi at this point, this created a high degree of dissonance resulting in considerable internal turmoil and anguish over the hypocrisy of practicing and preaching that which he no longer believed.  His private diaries and papers reveal that he was tortured within because his beliefs about the nature of religion and of Judaism conflicted with his duties as the leader of an Orthodox congregation.

In 1908 he married Lena Rubin, left KJ, and was ordained as a rabbi by Rabbi Isaac Jacob Reines while on his honeymoon in Europe.

In 1909 Kaplan became principal of the newly formed teacher's institute at JTS (which was by now Conservative), a position he would keep until he retired in 1963. He would later become dean in 1931, and retire in 1963. Kaplan was not primarily interested in academic scholarship, but rather on teaching future rabbis and educators to reinterpret Judaism and to make Jewish identity meaningful under modern circumstances. As a result, his work during this time he contributed greatly to the future of Jewish education in America.

Even those who disagreed with his views appreciated his direct approach. They were impressed by his emphasis on intellectual honesty in confronting the challenges posed by modern thought to traditional Jewish beliefs and practices. In his approach to Midrash and philosophies of religion, Kaplan combined scientific scholarship with creative application of the texts to contemporary problems. Kaplan's Reconstructionist philosophy influenced not only his own immediate students, but through them and through his extensive writings and public lectures over several decades, the American Jewish community at large. Many of his ideas, such as Judaism as a civilization (and not merely a religion or nationality), bat mitzvah, egalitarian involvement of women in synagogue and communal life, the synagogue as a Jewish center and not merely a place of worship, and living as Jews in a multicultural society, eventually came to be accepted as commonplace and implemented in all but strictly Orthodox segments of the community.

Early in his career, Kaplan became a devotee of the scientific and historical study of the Bible. He was the leading educator to confront rabbis, teachers, and laity with the changes in Jewish thought that had become necessary once the Bible had been exposed to modern techniques of examination and interpretation. But far from denigrating the genius of the biblical text, Kaplan taught his students to regard it as an indispensable source for an understanding of Jewish peoplehood and Jewish civilization.

In 1912, he was an advisor to the creators of the Young Israel movement of Modern Orthodox Judaism, together with Rabbi Israel Friedlander.

In speeches and articles in 1912 and 1916 he chided American Orthodox Judaism for not adequately embracing modernity.

He was a leader in creating the Jewish community center concept. Around 1916-1918 he organized the Jewish Center in New York, a community organization with a Modern Orthodox synagogue as its nucleus, the first of its kind in the United States, and was its rabbi until 1922.

Kaplan's ideology and rhetoric had been evolving, over the decade, but it was not until 1920 that he finally took a clear and irrevocable stand, criticizing "the fundamental doctrine of Orthodoxy, which is that tradition is infallible... The doctrine of infallibility rules out of court all research and criticism and demands implicit faith in the truth of whatever has come down from the past. It precludes all conscious development in thought and practice..." However, he was even more critical of Reform, saying that Reform was worse due to what he called Reform's "absolute break with the Judaism of the past".

Yet he still remained the Rabbi of the center until around 1922, when he resigned due to these ideological conflicts with the some of lay leadership. He, along with a sizeable group of congregants, then established the Society for the Advancement of Judaism, which later became the core of the Reconstructionist movement.

He held the first public celebration of a bat mitzvah in the United States, for his daughter Judith Kaplan, on March 18, 1922, at the Society for the Advancement of Judaism, his synagogue in New York City. Judith read from the Torah at this ceremony, a role that had traditionally been reserved for males.

In 1925, the American Zionist Organization sent Kaplan to Jerusalem as its official representative for the opening of Hebrew University.

From 1934 until 1970 Kaplan wrote a series of books in which he expressed his Reconstructionist ideology, which was an attempt to adapt Judaism to modern-day realities that Kaplan believed created the necessity for a new conception of God. His basic ideology was first defined in his 1934 work Judaism as a Civilization: Toward the Reconstruction of American-Jewish Life. In 1935 a biweekly periodical (the Reconstructionist) was started under Kaplan's editorship, which adopted the following credo: “Dedicated to the advancement of Judaism as a religious civilization, to the upbuilding of Eretz Yisrael [the Land of Israel] as the spiritual center of the Jewish People, and to the furtherance of universal freedom, justice, and peace.” Kaplan further refined the goals of his ideology in subsequent books including: The Meaning of God in Modern Jewish Religion (1937), Judaism Without Supernaturalism (1958), and The Religion of Ethical Nationhood (1970).

Kaplan saw his ideology as a "school of thought" rather than a separate denomination, and in fact resisted pressure to turn it into one, fearing that it might further fragment the American Jewish community, and hoping that his ideas could be applied to all denominations.

Kaplan was dissatisfied with traditional rituals and prayer, and sought to find ways to make them more meaningful to modern Jews. In, 1941 he wrote a controversial Reconstructionist Haggadah, for which he received criticism from colleagues at JTS. However, he this did not stop him from publishing the Reconstructionist Sabbath Prayer Book 1945, in which, among other unorthodoxies, he denied the literal accuracy of the biblical text. As a result, he was excommunicated by the Union of Orthodox Rabbis of the United States and Canada, who held a herem ceremony at which his prayer book was burned.

Although Kaplan preferred Reconstructionism remain a non-denominational school of thought rather than a separate denomination, in the late 40s to early 50s a number of laymen in synagogues throughout the United States decided to organize an independent federation of Reconstructionist synagogues, and by 1954 the Federation of Reconstructionist Congregations and Havurot was organized. As the years passed, the number of affiliates grew, but it was not until the late 1960s, that the movement actually became a separate denomination, when the Reconstructionist Rabbinical College opened its doors in 1968. By the beginning of the 21st century it would include over a 100 congregations and havurot.

Kaplan was a prolific writer. In addition to his published works, he kept a journal from 1913 until the late 1970s, with 27 volumes, each with 350 - 400 handwritten pages. The journal is certainly the largest by a Jew, and may even be one of the most extensive on record.

After the death of his wife in 1958, he married Rivka Rieger, an Israeli artist, in 1959. He died in New York City in 1983 at the age of 102. He was survived by Rivka and his daughters Dr. Judith Eisenstein, Hadassah Musher, Dr. Naomi Wenner and Selma Jaffe-Goldman; as well as seven grandchildren, and nine great-grandchildren.

Relationship with Orthodox Judaism
Kaplan began his career as an Orthodox rabbi at Congregation Kehilath Jeshurun in New York City, assisted in the founding of the Young Israel movement of Modern Orthodox Judaism in 1912, and was the first rabbi hired by the new (Orthodox) Jewish Center in Manhattan when it was founded in 1918. He proved too radical in his religious and political views for the organization and resigned from the Jewish Center in 1921. He was the subject of a number of polemical articles published by Rabbi Leo Jung (who became the rabbi of the Jewish Center in 1922) in the Orthodox Jewish press.

He then became involved in the Society for the Advancement of Judaism, where on March 18, 1922, he held (possibly) the first public celebration of a bat mitzvah in America, for his daughter Judith. This led to considerable criticism of Kaplan in the Orthodox Jewish press.

Kaplan's central idea of understanding Judaism as a religious civilization was an easily accepted position within Conservative Judaism, but his naturalistic conception of God was not as acceptable. Even at the Conservative movement's JTS, as The Forward writes, "he was an outsider, and often privately considered leaving the institution. In 1941, the faculty illustrated its distaste with Kaplan by penning a unanimous letter to the professor of homiletics, expressing complete disgust with Kaplan's The New Haggadah for the Passover seder.

Four years later, seminary professors Alexander Marx, Louis Ginzberg and Saul Lieberman went public with their rebuke by writing a letter to the Hebrew newspaper Hadoar, lambasting Kaplan's prayer book and his entire career as a rabbi." In 1945 the Union of Orthodox Rabbis "formally assembled to excommunicate from Judaism what it deemed to be the community's most heretical voice: Rabbi Mordecai Kaplan, the man who eventually would become the founder of Reconstructionist Judaism. Kaplan, a critic of both Orthodox and Reform Judaism, believed that Jewish practice should be reconciled with modern thought, a philosophy reflected in his Sabbath Prayer Book ..."

Due to Kaplan's evolving position on Jewish theology and the liturgy, he was also condemned as a heretic by members of Young Israel, which he had assisted in founding. His followers attempted to induce him to formally leave Conservative Judaism, but he stayed with its Jewish Theological Seminary until he retired in 1963. Finally, in 1968, his closest disciple and son-in-law Ira Eisenstein founded a separate school, the Reconstructionist Rabbinical College, in which Kaplan's philosophy, Reconstructionist Judaism, would be promoted as a separate religious movement.

University establishment
Kaplan wrote a seminal essay "On the Need for a University of Judaism," in which he called for a university setting that could present Judaism as a deep culture and developing civilization. His proposal included programs on dramatic and fine arts to stimulate Jewish artistic creativity, a college to train Jews to live fully in American and Jewish culture as contributing citizens, a school to train Jewish educators, and a rabbinical seminary to train creative and visionary rabbis. In 1947, with the participation of Rabbi Simon Greenberg, his efforts culminated in the establishment of the American Jewish University, then known as the University of Judaism. His vision continues to find expression in the graduate, undergraduate, rabbinical, and continuing education programs of the university.

Kaplan's theology
Kaplan's theology held that, in light of the advances in philosophy, science, and history, it would be impossible for modern Jews to continue to adhere to many of Judaism's traditional theological claims. Kaplan's naturalistic theology has been seen as a variant of John Dewey's philosophy. Dewey's naturalism combined atheism with religious terminology in order to construct a religiously satisfying philosophy for those who had lost faith in traditional religion. Kaplan was also influenced by Émile Durkheim's argument that our experience of the sacred is a function of social solidarity. Matthew Arnold and Hermann Cohen were among his other influences.

In agreement with prominent medieval Jewish thinkers including Maimonides, Kaplan affirmed that God is not personal, and that all anthropomorphic descriptions of God are, at best, imperfect metaphors. Kaplan's theology went beyond this to claim that God is the sum of all natural processes that allow man to become self-fulfilled:

To believe in God means to accept life on the assumption that it harbors conditions in the outer world and drives in the human spirit which together impel man to transcend himself. To believe in God means to take for granted that it is man's destiny to rise above the brute and to eliminate all forms of violence and exploitation from human society. In brief, God is the Power in the cosmos that gives human life the direction that enables the human being to reflect the image of God.

Not all of Kaplan's writings on the subject were consistent; his position evolved somewhat over the years, and two distinct theologies can be discerned with a careful reading. The view more popularly associated with Kaplan is strict naturalism, à la Dewey, which has been criticized as using religious terminology to mask a non-theistic (if not outright atheistic) position. A second strand of Kaplanian theology makes clear that God has ontological reality, a real and absolute existence independent of human beliefs, while rejecting classical theism and any belief in miracles. In 1973 he was one of the signers of the Humanist Manifesto II.

Bibliography
Although he began to publish books at what might be considered an advanced age, Kaplan was a prolific writer. His first and major work, Judaism as a Civilization, was first published in 1934, when Kaplan was 53. A full bibliography of over 400 items can be found in The American Judaism of Mordecai Kaplan, ed. by Emanuel S. Goldsmith, Mel Scult, and Robert Seltzer (1990).

Books
 Judaism as a Civilization (1934)
 Judaism in Transition (1936)
 Mesillat Yesharim: The Path of the Upright, with introduction and a new translation by Kaplan (1936)
 The Meaning of God in Modern Jewish Religion (1937) 
 The New Haggadah (1941)
 The Sabbath Prayer Book (1945)
 The Future of the American Jew (1948)
 The Faith of America: Prayers, Readings, and Songs for the Celebration of American Holidays (1951)
 Ha-emunah ve-hamusar (Faith and Ethics) (1954)
 A New Zionism (1955)
 Questions Jews Ask (1956)
 Judaism Without Supernaturalism (1958)
 A New Zionism: Second Enlarged Edition (1959)
 The Greater Judaism in the Making: : A Study of the Modern Evolution of Judaism (1960)
 The Purpose and Meaning of Jewish Existence: A People in the Image of God (1964)
 Not So Random Thoughts: Witty and Profound Observations on Society, Religion, and Jewish Life
 The Religion of Ethical Nationhood: Judaism's Contribution to World Peace (1970)
 If not now, when?: Toward a reconstitution of the Jewish people; conversations between Mordecai M. Kaplan and Arthur A. Cohen (1973)

Articles
 'What Judaism Is Not,' The Menorah Journal, Vol. 1, No. 4, (October 1915),
 'What Is Judaism,' The Menorah Journal, Vol. 1, No. 5, (December 1915),
 'Isaiah 6:1–11,' Journal of Biblical Literature, Vol. 45, No. 3/4, (1926).
 'The Effect of Intercultural Contacts upon Judaism,' The Journal of Religion, (January 1934).
 'The Evolution of the Idea of God in Jewish Religion,' The Jewish Quarterly Review, Vol. 57, (1967).

Awards 

 1971: National Jewish Book Award in the Jewish Thought for The Religion of Ethical Nationhood

See also
American philosophy
List of American philosophers

Notes

References

Further reading

 Sculpt, Mel, (1993)''Judaism Faces the Twentieth Century- A Biography of Mordecai M. Kaplan,  Wayne State University Press, Detroit,

External links
 
Audio and Video Resources for Mordecai Kaplan at Reconstructionist Rabbinical College
Video: Rabbi Prof. David Hartman lectures about Mordecai Kaplan
Diaries of Mordecai Kaplan - manuscript
Letters of Mordecai Kaplan can be found in the Records of the Jewish Reconstructionist Foundation, held at the American Jewish Historical Society in New York, NY

1881 births
1983 deaths
20th-century American Jews
20th-century American male writers
20th-century American philosophers
20th-century American writers
20th-century essayists
20th-century Lithuanian Jews
20th-century American rabbis
20th-century translators
American centenarians
American Conservative rabbis
American diarists
American essayists
American ethicists
American humanists
American Jewish theologians
American Jewish University
American Jews
American male essayists
American male non-fiction writers
American people of Lithuanian-Jewish descent
American political writers
American Reconstructionist rabbis
American religious writers
American sociologists
American translators
American Zionists
City College of New York alumni
Columbia University alumni
Critics of religions
Emigrants from the Russian Empire to the United States
Epistemologists
Founders of new religious movements
Heresy in Judaism
Jewish-American history
Jewish American writers
Jewish ethicists
Jewish humanists
Jewish religious writers
Jewish skeptics
Jewish socialists
Jewish sociologists
Jewish Theological Seminary of America semikhah recipients
Jewish translators
Jews and Judaism in New York City
Historians of philosophy
American historians of religion
Men centenarians
Metaphysicians
New York (state) socialists
Ontologists
Panentheists
Pantheists
People excommunicated by synagogues
People from Manhattan
People from Švenčionys
People from Sventsyansky Uyezd
Philosophers of culture
Philosophers of education
Philosophers of history
Philosophers of Judaism
Philosophers of religion
Philosophers of social science
Philosophy writers
Political philosophers
Pragmatists
Process philosophy
Process theologians
Rationalists
Religious naturalists
Reconstructionist Zionist rabbis
Social commentators
Social philosophers
Sociologists of religion
Theorists on Western civilization
Writers about activism and social change
Writers about religion and science